Coccothrinax cupularis is a palm which is endemic to southern Cuba.

Henderson and colleagues (1995) considered C. cupularis to be a synonym of Coccothrinax miraguama.

References

cupularis
Trees of Cuba
Plants described in 1939